= Layang-Layangan =

Town in Lauban, Malaysia

Coordinates: 5°20′10″N 115°11′58″E

Layang-Layangan is a small town in Federal Territory of Labuan, Malaysia. One of famous features is Surrender Point and Labuan Peace Park.
